Provincial Council elections were held in Greenland for the first time on 29 June 1951, alongside district council elections. Voter turnout was 73%.

Background
The Provincial Council was created after the Danish Parliament passed a law on 27 May 1950. It replaced two provincial councils covering the north and south of the island, which had been indirectly elected.

Electoral system
All Danish citizens over the age of 23 who had lived on the island for at least six months were eligible to vote or run for election. Candidates required nomination from 5-10 supporters. The 13 members of the Provincial Council were elected in single-member constituencies

The election had to be re-run in two constituencies; in Upernavik icy conditions had prevented distribution of election materials, whilst a measles outbreak in Nanortalik meant that most voters were ill on election day.

Results

Aftermath
The Provincial Council met for the first time on 25 September 1951.

References

1951 elections in North America
1951 in Greenland
1951
June 1951 events in North America